This is a chronological summary of the medal events of the 2016 Summer Olympics in Rio de Janeiro, Brazil. With 306 sets of medals, the games featured 28 Olympic sports, including rugby sevens and golf, which were added to the Olympic program in 2009. These sporting events took place at 33 venues in the host city, and at five in São Paulo, Belo Horizonte, Salvador, Brasília, and Manaus.

Due to the European migrant crisis and other reasons, the International Olympic Committee (IOC) allowed athletes to compete under the Olympic Flag as part of the "Refugee Olympic Team" (ROT); out of 43 refugee athletes deemed potentially eligible, 10 were chosen to form this team. Due to the suspension of the National Olympic Committee of Kuwait, participants from Kuwait were allowed to participate under the Olympic Flag as "Independent Olympic Athletes" (IOA).

Calendar

Medal table

Brazil was ranked 13th. See the complete medals table at 2016 Summer Olympics medal table.

Day 1 — Saturday 6 August

Day 2 — Sunday 7 August

Day 3 — Monday 8 August

Day 4 — Tuesday 9 August

Day 5 — Wednesday 10 August

Day 6 — Thursday 11 August

Day 7 — Friday 12 August

Day 8 — Saturday 13 August

Day 9 — Sunday 14 August

Day 10 — Monday 15 August

Day 11 — Tuesday 16 August

Day 12 — Wednesday 17 August

Day 13 — Thursday 18 August

Day 14 — Friday 19 August

Day 15 — Saturday 20 August

Day 16 — Sunday 21 August

Notes
* Athlete who participated in the heats only and received medals.
† Bronze medalist(s) were determined on the previous days.

References

External links
Official website
Medal winners

Chronological summary
2016